The striped smooth-hound (Mustelus fasciatus) is a houndshark of the family Triakidae, found on the continental shelves of the subtropical southwest Atlantic from southern Brazil to northern Argentina between latitudes 30° S and 47° S, from the surface to 250 m. It can grow up to a length of 1.77 m. The reproduction of this shark is Ovoviviparous, with the length at birth up to 39 cm.

References
 
 
 Compagno, Dando, & Fowler, Sharks, Collins Gem, HarperCollins, London 2006) 
Lorenz, Racz H. (2010). “New Maximum Length for the Striped Smooth-Hound Mustelus Fasciatus.” Biologica Marina Mediterranea, vol. 17, no. 1, pp. 258–259.

striped smooth-hound
Fish of Uruguay
Southeastern South American coastal fauna
striped smooth-hound